Snehaveedu is a 2011 Indian Malayalam-language family drama film written and directed by Sathyan Anthikad. It was produced by Alan Richard under the company Aashirvad Cinemas. The film stars Mohanlal, Sheela, and Rahul Pillai. It was Mohanlal's 300th film. The film received generally positive reviews from the critics and was a commercial success at the box office.

Plot

The story revolves around Ajayan, who after having tried his luck working in different cities around the world, returns to his village to look after his aging mother, Ammukutty Amma, and to get her love and the nostalgia of his early years. There, he starts an agricultural equipment manufacturing company and earns his living as a farmer.

One day, Karthik, a young boy approaches Ajayan claiming to be his son. Ajayan, who used to boast of himself as a womanizer in his youth, is believed to be the boy's father by all the villagers. Gradually, Ammukutty Amma starts to like Karthik and a loving relationship develops between the two of them. Eventually, she starts to accept Karthik as Ajayan's real son, though Ajayan rejects Karthik's claim and dislikes him. Karthik is persuaded by Ammukkty Amma to get close to Ajayan and subsequent events soften Ajayan's attitude towards Karthik.

To inquire about the real identity of the boy, Ajayan travels to Chennai, where he worked 20 years ago. He finds his old friend, Seithali. Seithali reveals to Ajayan that Shanti (Karthik's mother) used to act in movies as a background dancer but died one day during the shooting of a film. This news triggered Karthik to take his own life. To console Karthik, Seithali told him that he has a father and that he is not an orphan. Seithali showed Ajayan's photo to Karthik to get him to believe the lie. Moved by Karthik's situation, Ajayan accepts Karthik as his son.

Cast

Production
The film was reportedly first named Ammukuttiyammayude Ajayan.

Soundtrack

The songs in this movie were composed by Ilaiyaraaja. The lyrics were penned by Rafeeq Ahamed. Keerthy Ramachandran of The Deccan Chronicle commented that "lyrics of Rafeeq Ahmed are worth mentioning".

Reception

Critical response
Keerthy Ramachandran of The Deccan Chronicle gave the film three stars out of five. She wrote that the film portrays the elements of a village, typical of Anthikad films "beautifully". She also compared the plot of the film to that of Minnaram (1994) and commended the performance of Sheela, which she felt was "brilliant". However, she ended on a mixed note, writing "What disappoints is that [Sathyan] Anthikad, who has always come up with sensible themes, has failed to send any subtle message this time".
Paresh C Palicha of Rediff gave the movie a rating of 2.5 stars out of 5 and said "Snehaveedu is a feel good movie". It added "In the final analysis, Sathyan Anthikad mixes and matches his recent successful films like Manassinakare, Rasthanthram and even Achuvinte Amma to make Snehaveedu, which leaves his fans with little to complain about." At Indiaglitz gave the movie a rating of 5.75 stars out of 10 stars and said "'Sneha veedu' is packed with all the signature elements of Sathyan Anthikkad that the families of Kerala admire, but a more cohesive script and convincing climax complemented by hit music should have made this a winner."

Box office
The movie received positive response from the family audience. According to Cinebuzz.co.in, the film has opened at number one position on Kerala box office registering 80 percent collections in almost all the centres and made a 100+ days run in 1 centre. According to Sify.com, Snehaveedu opened at number one position on Kerala box office. This is declared as hit.

Awards
Asianet Film Awards
 Best Actor - Mohanlal
 Best Supporting Actor - Biju Menon
 Best Character Actor - Innocent
 Best Supporting Actor-Female - K. P. A. C. Lalitha
 Best Male Playback Singer - Hariharan

Mathrubhumi Film Awards
 Best Female Playback Singer - K. S. Chithra

References

External links
 

2011 drama films
2011 films
2010s Malayalam-language films
Films with screenplays by Sathyan Anthikad
Films directed by Sathyan Anthikad
Films scored by Ilaiyaraaja
Indian drama films
Indian family films
Films shot in Palakkad
Films shot in Ottapalam
Aashirvad Cinemas films
Films shot in Chennai